Yoshimizu Daichi (born 4 July 1941) is a Japanese Buddhist priest from Minato, Tokyo, who has contributed to the development of Buddhism in Vietnam from the past 50 years. He is considered a great Buddhist educator in Japan and Vietnam. He is Spiritual Advisor of Vietnamese Buddhist Association in Japan, former President of Jodo Shu Buddhism, Japan, and Deputy Chief Priest of Nisshinkutsu temple.

Honours and awards  
 National Vietnam Buddhist Sangha's Sangharaja's Award
 Prime Minister Nguyen Tan Dung's Award
 Honorary PhD Degree from Vietnam Buddhist University

References

http://giaitri.vnexpress.net/tin-tuc/gioi-sao/trong-nuoc/truong-thi-may-duoc-dai-lao-hoa-thuong-nhat-ban-tang-chu-2857898.html
http://www.phattuvietnam.net/blogchua/33452-th%C3%A1i-b%C3%ACnh-ht.yoshimizu-daichi-th%C4%83m-v%C3%A0-thuy%E1%BA%BFt-gi%E1%BA%A3ng-t%E1%BA%A1i-ch%C3%B9a-t%E1%BB%AB-x.html

1941 births
Living people
Japanese Buddhist clergy